Selamlı  is a village in Mut district of Mersin Province, Turkey. At  Selamlı is situated on the east bank of Göksu River. The population of the village was 400 as of 2012. Main economic activity is farming.

References 

Villages in Mut District